Demus is a surname. Notable people with the surname include:

Chaka Demus (born 1963), Jamaican reggae musician and DJ
Jörg Demus (1928–2019), Austrian classical pianist
Lashinda Demus (born 1983), American hurdler
Otto Demus (1902–1990), Austrian art historian
Roberto Demus (born 1979), Argentinean footballer

See also 
 Scratchy Demus